Adam Purdy (born 22 January 1981) is a retired Canadian Paralympic swimmer. He is a double Paralympic champion, double World champion and four-time Parapan American Games medalist. He works for a Danish IT company, KIMIK iT, which provides a web-based hosting platform for sporting events.

References

External links
 
 

1981 births
Living people
Swimmers from London, Ontario
Paralympic swimmers of Canada
Swimmers at the 1996 Summer Paralympics
Swimmers at the 2000 Summer Paralympics
Swimmers at the 2004 Summer Paralympics
Medalists at the 2000 Summer Paralympics
Paralympic medalists in swimming
Paralympic gold medalists for Canada
Medalists at the 2015 Parapan American Games
Canadian male backstroke swimmers
Canadian male butterfly swimmers
Canadian male medley swimmers
Medalists at the World Para Swimming Championships
S6-classified Paralympic swimmers